is a private junior college in Tokorozawa, Saitama, Japan, established in 1979. The predecessor of the school was founded in 1949.

Alumni 
Akie Yoshizawa, actress and singer, a former member of Onyanko Club.

External links
 Official website 

Japanese junior colleges
Educational institutions established in 1949
Private universities and colleges in Japan
Universities and colleges in Saitama Prefecture
1949 establishments in Japan
Buildings and structures in Tokorozawa, Saitama